Heilige Lieder is the ninth studio album by German rock band Böhse Onkelz, released 1992 through Bellaphon Records.

Critical reception

In 2005, the album was ranked number 360 in Rock Hard magazine's book of The 500 Greatest Rock & Metal Albums of All Time.

Track listing

Track notes

Scheißegal
The song deals with what is actually legal and what is illegal to do in today's society with regard to other people's reactions toward your actions. Scheißegal, meaning something like I don't give a shit, sung by the band deals with the fact that today you are bound to certain behaviours in our society and that you have to act in such way you can be accepted as a member of it. The band tries to tell the audience that they do not care about what people think about their actions and that this behaviour is not right.

Charts

References

Böhse Onkelz albums
1992 albums
German-language albums